Los Confines Airport is an airport serving Angol, a city in the Araucanía Region of Chile. The airport is just northeast of the city.

There is rising terrain west through north of the airport. Runway 18 has a  displaced threshold. The unpaved runway 18L has  of grass overrun.

See also

Transport in Chile
List of airports in Chile

References

External links
OpenStreetMap - Angol Los Confines
OurAirports - Los Confines
SkyVector - Los Confines
FallingRain - Los Confines Airport

Airports in La Araucanía Region